The Supercopa do Brasil de Futebol Feminino is a Brazilian association football trophy organized by the Brazilian Football Confederation (CBF). The tournament was announced in 2021 and played for first time in 2022.

Format
The competition is contested by 8 teams. The teams are chosen between the top twelve teams of the Campeonato Brasileiro de Futebol Feminino Série A1 and the top four teams of the Campeonato Brasileiro de Futebol Feminino Série A2 choosing only one team for state. If necessary, a state would gain a second berth according to its Women's State CBF Ranking position. The teams play a single-elimination tournament. All stages are played on a single-leg basis, with the highest-ranked-federation team in the Women's State Ranking hosting the leg.

Results

List of champions

References

Football cup competitions in Brazil
Brazil Women